Dismorphia lygdamis, the catasticta mimic or Lygdamis mimic white, is a butterfly in the family Pieridae. It is found in Ecuador and Peru. The habitat consists of cloud forests.

Adults appears to be a mimic of Catasticta sinapina.

Subspecies
The following subspecies are recognised:
Dismorphia lygdamis lygdamis (Ecuador)
Dismorphia lygdamis doris Baumann & Reissinger, 1969 (Peru)
Dismorphia lygdamis beatrix Lamas, 2004 (Peru)

References

Dismorphiinae
Butterflies described in 1869
Pieridae of South America
Taxa named by William Chapman Hewitson